Jaylon Terrell Jones (born October 14, 1997) is an American football cornerback for the Chicago Bears of the National Football League (NFL). He played college football at Ole Miss.

High school career
Jones was born on October 14, 1997, in Allen, Texas. He attended Allen High School and helped their football team make make it to the state championship game three years in a row. He was a first-team all-state selection by USA Today as a senior after making 61 tackles and an interception. He was ranked the ninth-best cornerback nationally by Scout.com and was a four-star prospect.

College career 
Jones committed to Ole Miss in July 2015. He played his first season in 2016, and was named a first-team freshman All-American after playing in every game and ranking second on the team in passes defended. As a sophomore in 2017, Jones started six games and appeared in 12 as a defensive back and return specialist. He was 19th nationally and third in the conference with 775 kick return yards, and returned a kickoff for a 97-yard touchdown against South Alabama. In the 2018 season opener, he made a career-high seven tackles and returned a kickoff 94 yards for a touchdown before suffering a season-ending injury.

As a redshirt-junior in 2019, Jones played in 10 games and started four at cornerback, recording 33 total tackles and five pass breakups. As a redshirt-senior in 2020, he started the first four games of the season before suffering a season-ending upper body injury. He had made 27 total tackles before getting injured. Jones announced he would return for a sixth season in 2021. He graduated following the 2021 season.

Professional career
After going unselected in the 2022 NFL Draft, Jones was signed by the Chicago Bears as an undrafted free agent. He was one of six cornerbacks to make the team's final roster. He made his NFL debut against the San Francisco 49ers in week one, playing on 15 special teams snaps in the 19–10 win. Jones made his first career start in the Bears' 29–22 loss against the Minnesota Vikings in week five, and recorded 13 combined tackles and a forced fumble.

References

External links
 Chicago Bears bio
 Texas A&M Aggies bio

1997 births
Living people
American football defensive backs
Players of American football from Texas
Ole Miss Rebels football players
Chicago Bears players
American football cornerbacks